Statistics of Swiss Super League in the 1976–77 season.

Overview
The Swiss Football Association had reformed the Swiss football league system that year, reducing the number of teams in the Nationalliga A from 14 to 12 and increasing the Nationalliga B teams from 14 to 16. The Nationalliga A season 1976–77 was contested by the first 11 teams from the 1975–76 season and the sole promoted team from Nationalliga B AC Bellinzona. The Nationalliga A was played in two stages. The qualification phase was played by all teams in a round robin and after completion was divided into two groups. The first six teams contended in the championship group (with half the obtained points as bonus) and the positions seventh to twelfth contended the relegation group (also with half the obtained points as bonus). Servette FC Genève and Basel finished the qualification phase in first and second position with 35 and 33 points from 22 games and so entered the championship group with a bonus of 18 and 17. At the end of the championship phase these two teams were level on 29 points. Therefore they had to compete a play-off match for champions. This play-off was held at the Wankdorf Stadium in Bern in front of 55,000 supporters. Basel won the match 2–1 and were awarded the championship.

The playout round ended with FC Winterthur and AC Bellinzona being relegated.

First stage

Table

Results

Second stage

Championship group

Table

Playoff match

Results

Playout group

Table

Results

Sources
 Rotblau: Jahrbuch Saison 2015/2016. Publisher: FC Basel Marketing AG. 
 Switzerland 1976–77 at RSSSF

Swiss Football League seasons
Swiss
1976–77 in Swiss football